Dot and the Koala is a 1985 Australian animated film from Yoram Gross.

Plot
Dot comes to the aid of her native animal friends, when Bruce the koala tells her of plans to build a massive dam that will destroy their environment. But the local farm animals believe that the creation of the dam will catapult their small country town into the 21st Century. With both sides fighting for what they believe is right, Dot's plans to wipe out the dam are jeopardized by the mayor Percy, a pig and local detectives Sherlock Bones the rat and his offsider, Watson the cat.

Cast
 Robyn Moore — Dot, misc.
 Keith Scott — Bruce, Mayor Percy, Sherlock Bones, Watson, misc.

References

External links

Dot and the Koala at Oz Movies

1985 films
1980s Australian animated films
1980s children's animated films
1980s musical films
Animated films about cats
Animated films about koalas
Animated films about rats
Australian animated feature films
Australian children's adventure films
Australian children's musical films
Films directed by Yoram Gross
Films with live action and animation
1980s English-language films
1980s Australian films
Flying Bark Productions films